Home is an album by American jazz trumpeter Bill Hardman which was recorded in 1978 and released on the Muse label.

Reception

The AllMusic review by Scott Yanow stated, "Bill Hardman had long been a talentedif not overly originalbop trumpet soloist. ...  Hardman is in excellent form on a pair of Brazilian pieces, two originals by pianist Mickey Tucker and Tadd Dameron's lesser-known 'I Remember Love.' There are also fine solos throughout this date".

Track listing
 "Samba do Brilho" (Guilherme Vergueiro) − 7:32	
 "Once I Loved" (Antônio Carlos Jobim, Vinícius de Moraes, Ray Gilbert) − 8:50
 "My Pen Is Hot" (Mickey Tucker) − 5:42
 "Rancho Cevarro" (Tucker) − 6:42
 "I Remember Love" (Tadd Dameron) − 6:35

Personnel 
Bill Hardman − trumpet, flugelhorn
Junior Cook − tenor saxophone
Slide Hampton − trombone
Mickey Tucker − piano 
Chin Suzuki − bass
Victor Jones − drums
Lawrence Killian − percussion

References 

1978 albums
Bill Hardman albums
Albums recorded at Van Gelder Studio
Muse Records albums